Zombie Nation is a  1990 Shoot 'em up game developed by KAZe and published by Meldac. It was first released in Japan on December 14, 1990 under the title , before being released later in the United States in January 1991. This game features a juxtaposition of zombies, aliens and samurai.

In Zombie Nation, the floating samurai head Namakubi goes to the United States to destroy Darc Seed—an alien who crashed to Earth via a meteorite in 1999, turned all the American people into zombies, and took control of various deadly weapons. Namakubi must recover the samurai sword Shura and destroy Darc Seed and its minions.

Gameplay
Depending on the version of the game, the player controls the giant levitating disembodied samurai head  or a giant Tengu mask. The player can destroy structures and enemies by shooting rapid-fire eyeballs and vomit at them. Enemies include zombie snipers, zeppelins and lava monsters. The player can upgrade their firepower by rescuing zombie hostages that leap out of structures when destroyed.

The player starts every level with a full life bar of eight units (displayed as mini Namakubi heads on the bottom of the screen), and as the player gets hit, the life bar decreases. When it is down to one bar remaining, the music changes to a dramatic theme. The game ends when the player loses all eight units of the life bar or is crushed by the scrolling of the screen. However, the player can regenerate some of their life by defeating enemies and structures. In addition, the player gets six (increasing by one for every stage section completed, up to a maximum of nine) continues to beat the game.

Zombie Nation features two difficulty levels, easy and hard. The game also allows the player, like in the Mega Man series, to select any stage at will. Once a stage is selected the following stages will be played sequentially cycling from stage 4 back to 1. The objective is to clear all four stages and then destroy the final boss, Darc Seed.

Story
The plot of both Zombie Nation and Abarenbou Tengu takes place in 1999, when a meteor known as "Darc Seed" (Eva in the Japanese version) crashes in the Nevada desert. Darc Seed/Eva then shoots magnetic rays and turns the people of the United States into zombies. Darc Seed/Eva also brings the Statue of Liberty to life to follow its commands. The magnetic rays also allow Darc Seed/Eva to control many deadly weapons, including the most powerful weapon of all—the legendary samurai sword Shura.

The head of the samurai Namakubi hears of Shura falling into Darc Seed's clutches. He then heads to the United States to destroy Darc Seed, free the American people from the looming zombification and reclaim the samurai sword Shura.

Development and release

The game was first released in Japan under the name Abarenbou Tengu on December 14, 1990. The US version was released a month later. As both versions only have differences between the sprites, with the Japanese version having a tengu mask belonging to Japanese folklore, the US version has major graphical and story changes, replacing the tengu mask with the decapitated samurai head. Aside from the differences, both games are practically identical, with the Japanese version having only a few major differences:
 In Abarenbou Tengu, the player must obtain the rapid fire ability. In Zombie Nation, the player starts with it.
 The main character's sprite is not that of the flying samurai head, Namakubi, but that of a Japanese konoha tengu head. The title screen is different with the tengu's head being incorporated into it.
 The boss of Round I is an evil Statue of Liberty in both games but with a slightly different sprite; instead of being green with snakes in place of its crown in Zombie Nation, it's red and has a normal crown.

Reception

The St. Petersburg Times tied the game with Splatterhouse 2 as the tenth best video game of 1992. Mashable, in ranking Zombie Nation the second weirdest video game of all time, claimed it "brings the side-scrolling shooter genre to a weird and gross new height. As challenging as it is confusing, the high point of this game is the chance to take down an animated, evil Statue of Liberty."

However, both versions of the game are considered a cult hit among gamers.

Other media
Abarenbou Tengu is one of the video games adapted into a manga titled , published in the Gamest Comics collection from April 1999, drawn by Kouta Hirano.

In August 2020, City Connection announced a re-release of the game under the name . The game was released on both the Nintendo Switch and Microsoft Windows platforms on October 28, 2021.

Notes

References

Citations

Bibliography 
 

1990 video games
KAZe games
Meldac games
Nintendo Entertainment System games
Scrolling shooters
Video games set in 1999
Alternate history video games
Video games about samurai
Video games developed in Japan
Video games set in the United States
Video games about zombies
Single-player video games
Works about tengu